Baranliq-e Madad Khan (also Romanized as Baranlīq-e Madad Khān; also known as Baranlaq-e Madad Khān and Baranlīq-e Soflá) is a village in Garmeh-ye Jonubi Rural District, in the Central District of Meyaneh County, East Azerbaijan Province, Iran. At the 2006 census, its population was 294, in 70 families.

References 

Populated places in Meyaneh County